Synergy: Live in Europe is the first live album  by Covenant, released as a stand-alone CD in 2000, as well as a CD/VHS set by dependent.

Track listing

References 

2000 live albums
Covenant (band) live albums